The Royal League 2005-06 fixtures and results.

Rules
Initially, the twelve participating teams are placed into three groups with four clubs each. These face each other home and away. The group winners and runners-up qualify for the quarter finals, along with the two best 3rd position-teams. From here on, the tournament is purely played as a two-legged knockout tournament, except from the final.

Bonuses
A wide variety of bonuses are paid in the Royal League 2005–06. A complete list is found below. All amounts are in Norwegian kroner.
Qualification to Royal League
Qualification to the tournament - 1,250,000 NOK (£ 141,525)
Qualification to quarterfinals
Group winner - 1,250,000 NOK (£ 141,525)
Group runner-up - 1,000,000 NOK (£ 113,220)
Group third place - 500,000 NOK (£ 56,610)
Match bonus
Win in group stage - 250,000 NOK (£ 28,305)
Draw in group stage - 125,000 NOK (£ 14,152.50)
Win in quarter- or semifinals - 400,000 NOK (£ 45,288)
Draw in quarter- or semifinals - 200,000 NOK (£ 22,644)
Win in the final (final champion) - 3,000,000 NOK (£ 339,660)
Loss in the final (final runner-up) - 1,000,000 NOK (£ 113,220)
Spectator bonus (for achieving a certain average attendance in home games, except the final)
Over 3,000 - 100,000 NOK (£ 11,322)
Over 4,000 - 150,000 NOK (£ 16,983)
Over 5,000 - 200,000 NOK (£ 22,644)
Over 6,000 - 300,000 NOK (£ 33,966)
Over 7,000 - 400,000 NOK (£ 45,288)
Over 8,000 - 500,000 NOK (£ 56,610)
Over 9,000 - 600,000 NOK (£ 67,932)
Over 10,000 - 800,000 NOK (£ 90,576)
Over 15,000 - 1,000,000 NOK (£ 113,220)

Group stage

Tiebreakers, if necessary, are applied in the following order:
Cumulative goal difference in all group matches.
Total goals scored in all group matches.
Points earned in head-to-head matches between the tied teams.
Total goals scored in head-to-head matches between the tied teams.
Away goals scored in head-to-head matches between the tied teams.
Draw.

Group 1

Group 2

Group 3

3rd placed teams

Knockout stage

Quarter-finals

First leg

Second leg 

Midtjylland win 4–1 on aggregate

Copenhagen win 3–0 on penalties after playing 2–2 on aggregate

Djurgården win 5–2 on aggregate

Lillestrøm win 2–0 on aggregate

Semi-finals

First leg

Second leg 

Copenhagen win 7–1 on aggregate

Lillestrøm win 4–1 on aggregate

Final

Top scorers

See also
 2005-06 Royal League statistics

 
2005–06
   
2005–06 in Danish football
2006 in Swedish football
2005 in Swedish football
2006 in Norwegian football
2005 in Norwegian football